Melbourne, Australia, is home to a large number of cultural institutions, museums and historic sites, some of which are known worldwide:

See also
Culture of Melbourne
List of museums in Victoria (Australia)

References

Melbourne

Melbourne
Museums
Lists of tourist attractions in Victoria (Australia)
Melbourne